Ralph Leslie Melville (12 May 1885 – 4 March 1919) was a Scottish-born American first-class cricketer and a soldier in the Canadian Expeditionary Force in the First World War.

Melville was born at Glasgow in May 1885. An emigrant to the United States, he settled in Philadelphia where he played club cricket for Merion Cricket Club and Belmont Cricket Club, playing in the Halifax Cup for both clubs between 1907 and 1917. An all-rounder, Melville made one appearance in first-class cricket for the Gentlemen of Philadelphia against the touring Australians at Haverford in 1913. In a drawn 2-day match, he batted once and was dismissed without scoring by Sid Emery. With his right-arm fast-medium bowling, he ten overs, though was uneconomical, conceding 63 runs. Melville headed north to Canada in the First World War, enlisting as a private with the 15th Canadian Infantry (1st Central Ontario Regiment) as part of the Canadian Expeditionary Force. He survived the fighting only to die at Wimereux in March 1919 from pneumonia resulting from the Spanish flu. He was buried at the Terlincthun British Cemetery at Boulogne. Melville is the last recorded cricketer to die while on active service during the First World War, some three months after Herbert Green, the last combat related death of a first-class cricketer.

References

External links

1885 births
1919 deaths
Cricketers from Glasgow
Scottish emigrants to the United States
Scottish cricketers
American cricketers
Philadelphian cricketers
Canadian Expeditionary Force soldiers
Deaths from the Spanish flu pandemic in France
Deaths from pneumonia in France
Canadian military personnel killed in World War I
Military personnel from Glasgow